Saba (also Romanized as Sabā; also known as Dakān Sorkh) is a village in Vahdatiyeh Rural District, Sadabad District, Dashtestan County, Bushehr Province, Iran. At the 2006 census, its population was 107, in 24 families.

References 

Populated places in Dashtestan County